L. pratensis may refer to:
 Lathyrus pratensis, a perennial legume species
 Leptosphaeria pratensis, a plant pathogen species